We Will All Evolve is the second album by New Hampshire-based band, Our Last Night. It was released on Epitaph Records. It was released on May 4, 2010. 
On March 23, the band changed their MySpace layout to reveal the album cover and they also added a song, "Elephants", along with the lyrics. On April 7, a second song, "Across the Ocean", was released on AbsolutePunk.

Track listing

Personnel
Our Last Night
 Trevor Wentworth – unclean vocals, additional guitars, programming
 Matt Wentworth – clean vocals, lead guitar, piano, programming
 Colin Perry – rhythm guitar
 Alex "Woody" Woodrow – bass guitar, backing vocals (bass tracks recorded by Wentworth and Perry; Woodrow was finishing college classes)
 Tim Molloy – drums, percussion

Production
 Andrew Wade – producer
 David Bendeth – mixing

References

2010 albums
Epitaph Records albums
Our Last Night albums
Albums produced by Andrew Wade